Goslineria is a genus of sea slugs, a dorid nudibranch, a shell-less marine gastropod mollusc in the family Dorididae.

Species 
Species in the genus Goslineria includes:

 Goslineria callosa Valdés, 2001

References

Dorididae